Girl with a Platter of Fruit (German: Mädchen mit Fruchtschale), also known as Lavinia Holding a Charger Filled with Fruit, Lavinia as Flora, and Pomona, is an oil painting by the Venetian painter Titian, made in about 1555–1558, and currently in the collection of the Gemäldegalerie, Berlin.

History 
The picture was painted about 1550–1555. It was bought in 1832 at Florence from Abbate Celotti. A similar picture is mentioned in the collection of Emperor Rodolphe II at Prague. Gronau mentions a "fine replica, done probably in the artist's workshop", which entered the collection of the Earl of Malmesbury.

Gallery

See also 
 Portrait of Lavinia Vecellio
 Salome (Titian, Madrid)
 Pomona (mythology)

References

Sources 

 Gronau, Georg (1904). Titian. London: Duckworth and Co; New York: Charles Scribner's Sons. pp. 285, 304.
 Ricketts, Christopher (1910). Titian. London: Methuen & Co. Ltd. pp. 147, 179, plate CXXXII.
 "Mädchen mit Fruchtschale". Staatliche Museen zu Berlin. Preußischer Kulturbesitz. Retrieved 11 August 2022.

1550s paintings
Paintings by Titian